Gowharan (also Romanized as Gowharān; also known as Gohrwan and Gyuravan) is a village in Gowharan Rural District, in the Central District of Khoy County, West Azerbaijan Province, Iran. At the 2006 census, its population was 2,173, in 528 families.

References 

Populated places in Khoy County